Kalaat Sraghna (Berber: ⵇⵍⵄⵜ ⵙⵔⴰⵖⵏⵙ, sometimes spelled El Kelaa des Srarhna) is a town in central Morocco. The economy of the town is mostly based on agriculture, the growing of olive trees being predominant.

History

According to some historical references, the Alaouite Sultan Moulay Ismail established the city, Kelaat Sraghnas in the 17th century. The Sultan had aimed to found citadels and Quasbas to control the movements of mountainous tribes. Other references state that the existence of the city refers to the period of the Almoravids. According to other sources,  the city was known as the Arabs designations such as "Gaynou" Lagrare, and it was founded by the Almoravids as a project to monitor the road between Fes and Marrakesh,  to populate the area and fight against Berghouata’s heresy. Nevertheless, some manuscripts cite evidence that Saadian Dynasty founded the city in the late the sixteenth century and it was known as the designation "Kelaat Lagrare".

Climate 
El Kelaa des Sraghna has a hot semi-arid climate (Köppen climate classification BSh).

References

Populated places in El Kelâat Es-Sraghna Province
Municipalities of Morocco
El Kelaa des Sraghna